"Why You Wanna" is a song by American rapper T.I., released as the second official single from his fourth album King (2006). It samples a slowed down keyboard chord from Crystal Waters' "Gypsy Woman (She's Homeless)". The chorus also interpolates rapper Q-Tip's vocals from "Got 'Til It's Gone" with Janet Jackson and "Find a Way" with his group A Tribe Called Quest.

Chart performance
The single peaked at number 29 on the US Billboard Hot 100 chart and spent a total of 20 weeks on the chart. The single also peaked at number five on the Hot R&B/Hip-Hop Songs and number four on the Hot Rap Songs charts.  On September 20, 2007, the song was certified gold by the Recording Industry Association of America (RIAA) for sales of over 500,000 copies in the United States.

In Australia, the single debuted at number 55 on the Australian ARIA Singles chart and eventually peaked at number 49.

Official versions
 Why You Wanna (Album Version)
 Why You Wanna (VSO)
 Why You Wanna (Radio Version- Vso Recall Clean)
 Why You Wanna (Amended Album Version)
 Why You Wanna (Benztown Mixdown)
 Why You Wanna (Instrumental)
 Why You Wanna (Remix) (feat. Trey Songz, Smitty & Q-Tip)
 Why You Wanna (Mick Boogie Remix) (feat. Q-Tip) (Official Remix)
 Why You Wanna (Remix) (feat. shy'm) (French Remix)

Charts

Weekly charts

Year-end charts

Certifications

References

External links

2006 singles
Grand Hustle Records singles
Atlantic Records singles
Music videos directed by Chris Robinson (director)
T.I. songs
Songs written by T.I.
2006 songs